Enemy Engaged: Apache vs Havoc (EEAH) is a helicopter flight simulator game developed by British developer Razorworks for Microsoft Windows and published by Empire Interactive on October 18, 1998.

Gameplay
The game features two fully simulated combat helicopters: the US AH64D Apache Longbow and Russian Mil-28N Havoc B.

Legacy
It was followed by Enemy Engaged: Comanche vs Hokum, which was interconnectable with Apache vs Havoc. It also has a sequel called Enemy Engaged 2.

It has been released on GOG.com on March 12, 2009.

Reception

Apache/Havoc was a runner-up for Computer Gaming Worlds 1999 "Simulation of the Year" award, which ultimately went to MiG Alley.

Reviews
CD-Action - Mar, 1999
GameSpot - Jun 15, 1999
GameStar (Germany) - Jan, 1999
PC Player (Germany) - Dec, 1998
IGN - May 03, 1999

References

External links
 (archived)

1998 video games
Combat flight simulators
Empire Interactive games
Helicopter video games
Razorworks games
Video games developed in the United Kingdom
Windows games
Windows-only games